South Korea maintains diplomatic relations with 191 countries. The country has also been a member of the United Nations since 1991, when it became a member state at the same time as North Korea. South Korea has also hosted major international events such as the 1988 Summer Olympics and 2002 World Cup Football Tournament (2002 FIFA World Cup co-hosted with Japan) and the 2011 IAAF World Championships Daegu South Korea. Furthermore, South Korea had hosted the 2018 Winter Olympics which took place in Pyeongchang, South Korea from 9 to 25 February.

South Korea is a member of the United Nations, WTO, OECD/DAC, ASEAN Plus Three, East Asia Summit (EAS), and G-20. It is also a founding member of Asia-Pacific Economic Cooperation (APEC) and the East Asia Summit.

On January 1, 2007, South Korean Foreign Minister Ban Ki-moon assumed the post of UN Secretary-General, serving in that post until December 31, 2016.

North Korea 

Inter-Korean relations may be divided into five periods. The first stage was between 1972 and 1973; the second stage was Pyongyang North Korea's delivery of relief goods to South Korea after a typhoon caused devastating floods in 1984 and the third stage was the exchange of home visits and performing artists in 1985. The fourth stage, activated by Nordpolitik under Roh, was represented by expanding public and private contacts between the two Koreas. The fifth stage was improved following the 1997 election of Kim Dae-jung. His "Sunshine Policy" of engagement with North Korea set the stage for the historic June 2000 Inter-Korean summit.

The possibility of Korean reunification has remained a prominent topic. However, no peace treaty has yet been signed with the North. In June 2000, a historic first North Korea-South Korea summit took place, part of the South Korea's continuing Sunshine Policy of engagement. Since then, regular contacts have led to a cautious thaw. President Kim was awarded the Nobel Peace Prize in 2000 for the policy.

With that policy, continued by the following administration of president Roh Moo-hyun, economic ties between the two countries have increased, humanitarian aid has been sent to North Korea and some divided families have been briefly reunited. Military ties remain fraught with tension, however, and in 2002 a brief naval skirmish left four South Korean sailors dead, leaving the future of the Sunshine policy uncertain. The North Korea cut off talks but the South remained committed to the policy of reconciliation and relations began to thaw again. The resurgence of the nuclear issue two years later would again cast relations in doubt, but South Korea has sought to play the role of intermediary rather than antagonist, and economic ties at the time seemed to be growing again.

Despite the Sunshine Policy and efforts at reconciliation, the progress was complicated by North Korean missile tests in 1993, 1998, 2006 and 2009. , relationships between North Korea and South Korea were very tense; North Korea had been reported to have deployed missiles, Ended its former agreements with South Korea and threatened South Korea and the United States not to interfere with a satellite launch it had planned.
As of 2009 North Korea and South Korea are still opposed and share a heavily fortified border.

On May 27, 2009, North Korea media declared that the armistice is no longer valid due to the South Korean government's pledge to "definitely join" the Proliferation Security Initiative. To further complicate and intensify strains between the two nations, the sinking of the South Korean warship Cheonan in March 2010, killing 46 seamen, is as of May 20, 2010 claimed by a team of researchers around the world to have been caused by a North Korean torpedo, which the North denies. South Korea agreed with the findings from the research group and president Lee Myung-bak declared in May 2010 that Seoul would cut all trade with North Korea as part of measures primarily aimed at striking back at North Korea diplomatically and financially. As a result of this, North Korea severed all ties and completely abrogated the previous pact of non aggression.

In November 2010, the Unification Ministry officially declared the Sunshine Policy a failure, thus bringing the policy to an end. On November 23, 2010, North Korean artillery shelled Yeonpyeong with dozens of rounds at Yeonpyeong-ri and the surrounding area.

According to a 2013 BBC World Service Poll, 3% of South Koreans view the Democratic People's Republic of Korea's influence positively, with 91% expressing a negative view. A 2015 government-sponsored poll revealed that 41% of South Koreans consider North Korea to be an enemy, with negative views being more prevalent among younger respondents. Still, in a 2017 poll, 58% of South Koreans said they don't expect another war to break out with North Korea.

Free trade agreements 

South Korea has the following trade agreements:
South Korea-ASEAN (Brunei, Cambodia, Indonesia, Laos, Malaysia, Myanmar, Philippines, Singapore, Thailand, Vietnam) FTA
South Korea-Australia FTA
South Korea-Canada CKFTA FTA
South Korea Central America (Costa Rica, El Salvador, Honduras, Nicaragua, Panama) FTA
South Korea-Chile FTA
South Korea-China FTA 
South Korea-Colombia FTA 
South Korea-EFTA (Iceland, Lichtenstein, Norway, Switzerland) FTA 
South Korea-EU (Austria, Belgium, Bulgaria, Croatia, Cyprus, Czech Republic, Denmark, Estonia, Finland, France, Germany, Greece, Hungary, Ireland, Italy, Latvia, Lithuania, Luxembourg, Malta, Netherlands, Poland, Portugal, Romania, Slovakia, Slovenia, Spain, Sweden, UK) FTA
South Korea-India CEPA FTA
South Korea-New Zealand FTA
South Korea-Peru FTA  
South Korea-Singapore FTA
South Korea-Turkey FTA
South Korea-United Kingdom FTA
South Korea-United States of America (KORUS FTA)
South Korea-Vietnam FTA

As of late 2021 states of GCC (Gulf Cooperation Council—Bahrain, Kuwait, Oman, Qatar, Saudi Arabia, United Arab Emirates), Indonesia, Israel, Japan, Malaysia, MERCOSUR (Southern Common Market—Mercado comun del sur), Mexico, Mongolia, RCEP (Asian 10 Countries, Korea, China, Japan, Australia, New Zealand, India), Russia (BEPA), SACU (South Asia Cooperation Union) and Korea-China-Japan are in negotiations about the FTA with South Korea.

China (PRC) 

Active South Korean-Chinese people-to-people contacts have been encouraged. Academics, journalists and particularly families divided between South Korea and the People's Republic of China (PRC) were able to exchange visits freely in the late 1980s. Nearly 2 million ethnic Koreans especially in the Yanbian Korean Autonomous Prefecture in Jilin Province of Northeast China have interacted with South Koreans.

Trade between the two countries continued to increase nonetheless, Furthermore, China has attempted to mediate between North Korea and the United States, and between North Korea and Japan. China also initiated and promoted tripartite talks between North Korea, South Korea and the U.S.

South Korea had long been an ally of Taiwan. Diplomatic ties between Seoul and Taipei were nevertheless severed in 1992. Formal diplomatic relations were established between Seoul and Beijing on August 24, 1992.

In 2004 the PRC government began the Northeast Project, sparking a massive uproar in South Korea when the project was widely publicized.

After the KORUS FTA (United States-South Korea Free Trade Agreement) was finalized on June 30, 2007 the Chinese government has immediately begun seeking an FTA agreement with South Korea. The FTA between South Korea and China are under discussion South Korea has been running a trade surplus with China which hit a record US$32.5 billion in 2009.

Taiwan (ROC) 

On 23 August 1992, the government of the Republic of China (by then only in control of the island of Taiwan and a few outlying areas) severed diplomatic relations with South Korea in advance of its announcement of formal recognition of the People's Republic of China based in Beijing. The Yonhap News said in 2002 that since then relations between the two governments have been "in a rut".

Japan 

The relation between South Korea and Japan has both political conflicts and economic intimacies. Examples of conflicts include the East sea naming dispute, visits by successive Japanese Prime Ministers to the Yasukuni Shrine and the disputed ownership of Dokdo of the island Korea.

On January 18, 1952 The first president of South Korea Syngman Rhee declared that the vicinity of Dokdo was a territory of South Korea (Syngman Rhee line). Subsequently, some 3,000 Japanese fishermen who conducted fishery operations in this vicinity were captured. This incident, called the Dai Ichi Daihoumaru Ship case strained relations between South Korea and Japan.

June 22, 1965, The president in South Korea Park Chung-hee concluded the Treaty on Basic Relations between Japan and South Korea As a result, Japan considered South Korea to be the legitimate successor of its rule over the Korean Peninsula.

South Korea's trade with Japan was US$892.1 million in 2008, with a surplus of nearly US$327.1 million on the Japanese side. Japanese and South Koreans firms often had interdependent relations, which gave Japan advantages in South Korea's growing market.

In 1996 FIFA announced that the South Korea-Japan would jointly host the 2002 FIFA World Cup. The next few years would see leaders of both countries meet to warm relations in preparations for the games. The year 2005 was designated as the "Japan-South Korea Friendship Year".

However, the Liancourt Rocks controversy erupted again when Japan's Shimane Prefecture declared "Takeshima Day", inciting mass demonstrations in South Korea.

Mongolia

Both countries established diplomatic relations on March 26, 1990. South Korea has an embassy in Ulaanbaatar Mongolia. Mongolia has an embassy in Seoul.

Philippines

Since the establishment of diplomatic ties on 3 March 1949, the relationship between the Philippines and South Korea has flourished. The Philippines was one of the first countries that extended diplomatic recognition to South Korea. This was cemented with the Philippine government's deployment of the Philippine Expeditionary Force to Korea (PEFTOK) to help South Korea against the invasion of the communist North during the Korean War in the 1950s. After the war, the Philippines provided development assistance to South Korea and helped the country rebuild itself.

Since then, the Philippines's relations with South Korea have evolved with South Korea becoming one of the Philippines's most important bilateral partners aside from the United States, China and Japan. The Philippines's government seeks to cultivate strategic ties with South Korea given its increasing presence in the country. In the coming years, the Philippines anticipates to benefit from exploring unprecedented opportunities from South Korea that shall contribute significantly to the country's trade and economy, defense and security, and society and culture.

Russia

In the 1980s South Korean president Roh Tae Woo's Nordpolitik and Mikhail Gorbachev's "New Thinking" were both attempts to reverse their nations' recent histories. Gorbachev had signaled Soviet interest in improving relations with all countries in the Asia-Pacific region including South Korea as explained in his July 1986 Vladivostok and August 1988 Krasnoyarsk speeches.

In initiating Nordpolitik Roh's confidential foreign policy adviser was rumored to have visited Moscow Russia to consult with Soviet policymakers. Kim Young Sam visited Moscow Russian Federation from June 2 to June 10, 1989 as the Kremlin announced that it would allow some 300,000 Soviet-South Koreans who had been on the Soviet island of Sahkalin since the end of World War II to return permanently to South Korea. Moscow even arranged Kim's meeting with the North Korean ambassador to the Soviet Union In June 1990, Roh held his first summit with president Gorbachev in San Francisco, United States.

South Korea and the Soviet Union established diplomatic relations on September 30, 1990. These relations continued by the Russian Federation on December 27, 1991. Russian president Vladimir Putin visited Seoul in February 2001 while South Korean president Roh Moo-hyun visited Moscow Russia in September 2004.

Russian Federal Space Agency and the Korean Astronaut Program cooperated together to send South Korea's first astronaut into space. Yi So-Yeon became the first South Korean national as well as the third woman to be the first national in space on 8 April 2008 when Soyuz TMA-12 departed from Baikonur Cosmodrome.

Since the 1990s there has been greater trade and cooperation between the Russian Federation and South Korea. The total trade volume between South Korea and Russia in 2003 was 4.2 billion U.S. dollars.

United Kingdom

The establishment of diplomatic relations between the United Kingdom and South Korea began on 18 January 1949.

Visits from South Korea to the United Kingdom:
 1986 April: president Chun Doo-hwan 
 1989 November: president Roh Tae-woo 
 1995 March: president Kim Young-sam
 1998 April: president Kim Dae-jung
 2001 December: president Kim Dae-jung
 2004 December: president Roh Moo-hyun
 2006 February: Minister of Foreign Affairs and Trade Ban Ki-moon
 2006 June: Minister of Foreign Affairs Ban Ki-moon
 2009 April: president Lee Myung-bak (G20)
 2013 April: Special envoy of the president, former prime minister Han Seung-soo (to attend the funeral of former British prime minister Margaret Thatcher)
 2013 November: president Park Geun-hye
 2014 December: Minister of Foreign Affairs Yun Byung-se.

From the United Kingdom to South Korea:
 1986 May: Prime Minister Margaret Thatcher
 1992 November: Prince Charles and Princess Diana
 1996 March: Prime Minister John Major
 1997 April: Duke of Gloucester
 1997 October: Duke of Kent
 1999 April: Queen Elizabeth II
 2000 October: Prime Minister Tony Blair
 2003 July: Prime Minister Tony Blair
 2001 April: Duke of York
 2005 November: Duke of York
 2006 October: Deputy Prime Minister John Prescott
 2008 September: Duke of York
 2008 December: G20 Special Envoy Timms
 2009 October: Minister of Business, Innovation and Skills Peter Benjamin Mandelson
 2010 November: Prime Minister David Cameron
 2012 March: Deputy Prime Minister Clegg to attend Seoul Nuclear Security Summit
 2013 October: Secretary of State for Foreign and Commonwealth Affairs William Hague (to attend Seoul Conference on Cyberspace 2013).

United States 

The United States engaged in the decolonization of Korea (mainly in the South, with the Soviet Union engaged in North Korea) from Japan after World War II. After three years of military administration by the United States, the South Korean government was established. Upon the onset of the Korean War, U.S. forces were sent to defend South Korea against invasion by North Korea and later China. Following the Armistice, South Korea and the U.S. agreed to a "Mutual Defense Treaty", under which an attack on either party in the Pacific area would summon a response from both.

In 1968, South Korea obliged the mutual defense treaty, by sending a large combat troop contingent to support the United States in the Vietnam War. The U.S. Eighth Army, Seventh Air Force, and U.S. Naval Forces Korea are stationed in South Korea. The two nations have strong economic, diplomatic, and military ties, although they have at times disagreed with regard to policies towards North Korea, and with regard to some of South Korea's industrial activities that involve usage of rocket or nuclear technology. There had also been strong anti-American sentiment during certain periods, which has largely moderated in the modern day.

Since the late 1980s, the country has instead sought to establish an American partnership, which has made the Seoul–Washington relationship subject to severe strains. Trade had become a serious source of friction between the two countries. In 1989, the United States was South Korea's largest and most important trading partner and South Korea was the seventh-largest market for United States goods and the second largest market for its agricultural products.

From Roh Tae-woo's administration to Roh Moo Hyun's administration, South Korea sought to establish a U.S. partnership, which has made the Seoul–Washington relationship subject to some strains. In 2007, a free trade agreement known as the Republic of Korea-United States Free Trade Agreement (KORUS FTA) was reportedly signed between South Korea and the United States, but its formal implementation has been repeatedly delayed, pending further approval by the legislative bodies of the two countries.

The relations between the United States and South Korea have greatly strengthened under the Lee Myung-bak administration. At the 2009 G-20 London summit, U.S. President Barack Obama called South Korea "one of America's closest allies and greatest friends."

However, some anti-American sentiment in South Korea still exists; the United States' alleged role in the May 1980 Gwangju uprising was a pressing South Korean political issue of the 1980s. Even after a decade, some Gwangju citizens and other South Koreans still blamed the United States for its perceived involvement in the bloody uprising. In 2008, the protests against U.S. beef was a center of a major controversy that year.

In a June 2010 open letter from President of South Korea Lee Myung-bak published in the Los Angeles Times, he expressed gratitude for the 37,000 Americans who were killed in the Korean War defending South Korea, saying that they fought for the freedom of South Koreans they did not even know. He stated that thanks to their sacrifices, the peace and democracy of the South Korean state was protected.

The U.S. states that "The Alliance is adapting to changes in the 21st Century security environment. We will maintain a robust defense posture, backed by allied capabilities which support both nations' security interests We will continue to deepen our strong bilateral economic, trade and investment relations In the Asia-Pacific region we will work jointly with regional institutions and partners to foster prosperity, keep the peace, and improve the daily lives of the people of the region The United States and South Korea will work to achieve our common Alliance goals through strategic cooperation at every level."

Vietnam 

The relationship between these two Sinosphere countries is usually described as "from enemies to friends". Despite the two states' hostile positions in the Vietnam War and South Korean war crimes and atrocities in the Vetnam War, which are still recently sparkling some controversies between the two states, both countries have still become each other's most important trade partner throughout their relationship. South Korea is the third biggest trade partners of Vietnam while also being the second-biggest ODA provider and the biggest foreign direct investor to Vietnam; meanwhile, Vietnam is the third-biggest trade partner of South Korea and it is also hosting many important factories and facilities of South Korea's biggest conglomerate such as Samsung and LG.

In December 2022, the two nations have elevated their ties to comprehensive strategic partnership - technically the highest level of bilateral relationship that is designated by the Vietnamese side. Both countries have aimed to raise their two-way trade to 100 billion U.S. dollars in 2023 and expected to reach 150 billion by the end of this decade. Besides major economic ties and cooperations, South Korea and Vietnam also plan to further cooperate in politics, cultural exchange, resources exploitation, national security as well as in the defense sectors. Both countries share core benefits, concerns, and support to each other in issues related to the security of the region, noticeably Vietnamese support towards South Korea's effort in denuclearization of the Korean Peninsula (mentioning North Korea) and South Korea's support on Vietnam's attitude towards the stability and freedom of navigation of the South China Sea. Vietnam is also an important partner of South Korea to exercise its Indo-Pacific strategy and the insight to strengthen South Korea's relationship with the Association of Southeast Asian Nations. It is said that Vietnam can be a "bridge" or "ambassador" representing South Korea's influence to the Southeast Asia region.

In the state visit of the President of Vietnam to South Korea in December 2022, South Korean President Yoon Suk-yeol has honored Vietnamese President Nguyễn Xuân Phúc as "my very first national guest" (referring the fact that his Vietnamese counterpart was the first head of state to visit South Korea during his terms), and also saying that the people of Vietnam and South Korea are "close brothers".

European Union 

The European Union (EU) and South Korea are important trading partners, having negotiated a free trade agreement for many years since South Korea was designated as a priority FTA partner in 2006. The free trade agreement has been approved in September 2010, following Italy's conditional withdrawal of its veto of the free trade agreement. The compromise made by Italy was that free trade agreement would take provisional effect on July 1, 2011. South Korea is the EU's eighth largest trade partner and the EU has become South Korea's second largest export destination. EU trade with South Korea exceeded €65 billion in 2008 and has enjoyed an annual average growth rate of 7.5% between 2004 and 2008.

The EU has been the single largest foreign investor in South Korea since 1962 and accounted for almost 45% of all FDI inflows into South Korea in 2006. Nevertheless, EU companies have significant problems accessing and operating in South Korea market due to stringent standards and testing requirements for products and services often creating barriers to trade. Both in its regular bilateral contacts with South Korea and through its FTA with South Korea, the EU is seeking to improve this situation.

Diplomatic relations

Americas

Asia

Oceania

Europe

Middle East and Africa

No diplomatic relations 
South Korea does not currently have any diplomatic relations with the following nations.

There are also no diplomatic relations with several unrecognized territories:

See also 
 List of diplomatic missions in the Republic of Korea
 List of diplomatic missions of the Republic of Korea
 List of international trips made by presidents of South Korea
 Foreign relations of North Korea

References

Further reading
 Ahn, B.J. "Korea: A Rising Middle Power in World Politics", Korea and World Affairs 1987.  11#1  pp 7–17.
 Choi, Young Jong. "South Korea's regional strategy and middle power activism." Journal of East Asian Affairs(2009): 47–67. online
 Hwang, Balbina Y. "The US Pivot to Asia and South Korea's Rise." Asian Perspective 41.1 (2017): 71–97.
 John, Jojin V. "Becoming and being a middle power: exploring a new dimension of South Korea's foreign policy." China Report 50.4 (2014): 325–341.  online
 John, Jojin V. "Globalization, National Identity and Foreign Policy: Understanding'Global Korea'." Copenhagen Journal of Asian Studies 33.2 (2016): 38–57.  online
 Kim Jinwung. "Recent Anti-Americanism in South Korea: The Causes" Asian Survey,  1989 29#8  749–63
 Kim, Min‐hyung. "South Korea's China Policy, Evolving Sino–ROK Relations, and Their Implications for East Asian Security." Pacific Focus 31.1 (2016): 56–78.
 Kim, Samuel S. ed. International Relations of Northeast Asia (Rowman and Littlefield,)  esp pp 251–80
 Lee, Sook Jong, ed. Transforming Global Governance with Middle Power Diplomacy: South Korea's Role in the 21st Century (Springer, 2016) online.
 Milani, Marco, Antonio Fiori, and Matteo Dian, eds. The Korean Paradox: Domestic Political Divide and Foreign Policy in South Korea (Routledge, 2019).
 Nam, Sung-Wook, et al. eds. South Korea's 70-Year Endeavor for Foreign Policy, National Defense, and Unification (Springer, 2018).
 Rozman, Gilbert. "South Korea and Sino-Japanese rivalry: A middle power's options within the East Asian core triangle: Pacific Review 2007.  20#2 pp 197–220.
 Saxer, Carl J. "Capabilities and aspirations: South Korea's rise as a middle power," Asia Europe Journal 2013. 11#4 pp  397–413.
 Tayal, Skand R. India & the Republic of Korea: Engaged Democracies  (2013)

External links
 Pride and Prejudice in South Korea's Foreign Policy
 Junotane Korea - Foreign Affairs
 Alon Levkowitz, The Republic of Korea and the Middle East: Economics, Diplomacy, and Security
 Olympic.org